Duplessis may refer to:

Duplessis (surname)
Maurice Duplessis (1890–1959), the 16th premier of Quebec
Duplessis (TV series), a historical television series about Maurice Duplessis that aired in Québec in 1978
Duplessis Orphans scandal
Duplessis (provincial electoral district), provincial electoral district in Quebec, Canada
Duplessis, Louisiana, an unincorporated community in the United States

See also
 Du Plessis (disambiguation)